is a Japanese politician of the Liberal Democratic Party, a member of House of Representatives in the Diet (national legislature). A native of Shioya District, Tochigi he attended Tokyo University of Agriculture and Technology as both undergraduate and graduate students. After college, he worked at the government Tochigi Prefecture from 1967 to 1978. He was elected to the assembly of Tochigi Prefecture for the first time in 1979 and then to the Diet for the first time in 1996.

On 9 December 2020, he resigned as the special adviser to the Cabinet after being involved in a bribery scandal corresponding to a boating trip hosted by a former head of a major egg farm, who was involved in a separate bribery case.

References

External links 
  

1942 births
Living people
Politicians from Tochigi Prefecture
Members of the House of Representatives (Japan)
Tokyo University of Agriculture and Technology alumni
Liberal Democratic Party (Japan) politicians
Ministers of Agriculture, Forestry and Fisheries of Japan
21st-century Japanese politicians